This is a list of diplomatic missions of Nigeria. Nigeria, the most populous African country, has a moderately large network of diplomatic missions.  The country has significant influence in Africa and in various multilateral fora, including the Organisation of Islamic Cooperation, OPEC, the Commonwealth, and the African Union.

Nigeria first started sending twelve diplomatic personnel overseas to serve in British missions from 1957.  Three years later upon independence the country had its own foreign ministry, headed by Foreign Minister Jaja Wachukwu.  Now the Nigerian foreign ministry has over 2,000 officers.

Current missions

Africa

Americas

Asia

Europe

Oceania

Multilateral organisations 

 Food and Agriculture Organization
Rome (Permanent Mission)

Gallery

Closed missions

Americas

Asia

Europe

See also
 Foreign relations of Nigeria
 List of diplomatic missions in Nigeria
 Visa policy of Nigeria

Notes

References

 Nigerian Embassies and High Commissions

 
Diplomatic missions
Nigeria